Patrick O'Reilly (9 January 1893 – 25 April 1972) was an Irish politician. A farmer by trade, O'Reilly was elected to Dáil Éireann as an independent Teachta Dála (TD) for the Cavan constituency at the 1948 general election. He lost his seat at the 1951 general election and was an unsuccessful candidate at the 1954 general election.

References

1893 births
1972 deaths
Independent TDs
Members of the 13th Dáil
Politicians from County Cavan
Irish farmers